2-Hexanol (or hexan-2-ol) is a six carbon alcohol in which the OH group is located on the second carbon atom. Its chemical formula is C6H14O or C6H13OH.  It is an isomer of the other hexanols. 2-Hexanol has a chiral center and can be resolved into two different enantiomers.

References

Hexanols
Secondary alcohols